In the evening of 6 July 2021, Dutch investigative journalist and crime reporter Peter R. de Vries was shot in the head after leaving the television studio of RTL Boulevard in Amsterdam where he had appeared as a guest. Several bullets were fired at him in the Lange Leidsedwarsstraat, near the Leidseplein, while he was walking to his car. He was taken to the VU University Medical Center in critical condition. De Vries died of his injuries on 15 July 2021.

Background

Peter R. de Vries was a television personality and the most well-known crime reporter in the Netherlands. He gained national prominence with his own television program Peter R. de Vries: Crime Reporter. Throughout his career, he reported about high-profile criminal cases, such as the kidnapping of Freddy Heineken, the disappearance of Natalee Holloway, the murder of Marianne Vaatstra, as well as other murder cases, scandals and wrongful convictions.

Later in his career, he became one of the most visible figures in the journalistic investigation of cold cases in the Netherlands, such as the death of Nicky Verstappen, in which he supported the victim's family in court. He also was a frequent guest in talk shows and started a short political career with his own political party. A central theme in his later work was his fight against (what he saw as) injustice.

In 2021, De Vries supported the crown witness Nabil B. in the Marengo process. Less than two years earlier, B.'s lawyer, Derk Wiersum, had been murdered outside his home in Amsterdam.

Reactions

The King Willem-Alexander of the Netherlands called it an attack on journalism and an attack on the rechtsstaat (rule of law). On the evening of the attack, the Amsterdam mayor Femke Halsema, chief public prosecutor René de Beukelaer and police chief Frank Paauw held a press conference. Halsema spoke of a "brutal cowardly crime". Prime Minister Mark Rutte and Minister of Justice Ferdinand Grapperhaus also held a press conference. Rutte called it an attack on free journalism. The attack "affects journalists and damages our society", according to Grapperhaus. The Dutch Association of Journalists stated: "This hits journalism right in the heart." Ursula von der Leyen, President of the European Commission, expressed her condolences and expressed her support for the Dutch authorities to bring the perpetrators to justice. After the death of De Vries, Rutte stated that "We owe it to Peter R. de Vries to ensure that justice takes place". Many people have reacted to the attack and his death, including many members of the Dutch House of Representatives and members of the European Parliament. Crime reporter John van den Heuvel stated that "[De Vries] will always remain an example and a source of inspiration".

Investigation
The Dutch police arrested three suspects that same evening. Two suspects were in a car that was stopped on the A4 motorway near Leidschendam. The third person was released the next day, and is no longer a suspect. As of July 15, a 35-year-old Polish man identified as Kamil E. is the suspected getaway car driver, while a 21-year-old man and aspiring rapper, known as Delano G. is the suspected shooter. Dutch media has reported that the suspected killer is the nephew or cousin of one of the henchmen of Ridouan Taghi. De Vries was involved in the prosecution of Taghi.

The trial against the two suspects opened in Amsterdam in June 2022.

Security
De Vries was frequently threatened, but did not want any police or private security. However, there was criticism that he could have been protected better. He had a tattoo on his leg with his motto On bended knee is no way to be free. He explained the tattoo as "It means that we are not subservient to anyone. That no one can dominate us. That means that we are never, ever, anyone's slave." The demissionary Minister of Justice and Security, Ferd Grapperhaus, commissioned an independent investigation into the security of De Vries. His partner, Tahmina Akefi, said that his murder could have been prevented and that the system failed them. She also denied reports that De Vries did not want security.

See also
 Murder of Derk Wiersum

References

External links

Deaths by firearm in the Netherlands
Deaths by person in the Netherlands
July 2021 crimes in Europe
Organized crime events in the Netherlands
Mocro Maffia
Violent non-state actor incidents in Europe
Crime in Amsterdam
Assassinations in the Netherlands
2021 murders in the Netherlands